Elizabeth Alex is an American former news anchor who was the lead anchor for KSHB-TV ("41 Action News") in Kansas City, Missouri until 2013.

Biography
Alex is a native of the Kansas City area, growing up in Overland Park and graduating from Shawnee Mission West. Alex attended the University of Arkansas and worked in Fayetteville and Fort Smith, Arkansas, The Quad Cities and West Palm Beach, Florida before settling back in her hometown.

Alex has earned many journalism awards during the course of her career.  They include awards for all around reporting, feature, investigative and 4 regional Emmys.  Her honors include work on a six-month project into pollution at a former oil refinery in Sugar Creek.
Alex has been named "Best Newscaster" by Pitch Weekly magazine and The Johnson County Squire.  She has also been honored by the National Kidney Foundation and received a Humanitarian Award from Medical Missions Foundation.

Alex spends much of her time involved with humanitarian causes around the world.
She is on the board of directors for Medical Missions Foundation-a group that delivers free medical care to developing countries, Smile Again USA-an organization that helps provide reconstructive surgery to Pakistani women attacked with battery acid, and she personally sponsors and advocates for the health of a little girl from The Gaza Strip with serious medical needs.  Alex is also an enthusiastic supporter of Operation Breakthrough Center for children in Kansas City, Heart to Heart, International aid organization and she organizes a food drive to benefit St. Therese Little Flower Food Pantry. Alex has covered the war in Afghanistan, the tsunami in Sri Lanka, and the aftermath of Hurricane Katrina in New Orleans.

Alex also shares a close bond with cancer patients and their families following the loss of her late husband, Brian to esophageal cancer.  She has reported on, and often speaks about esophageal cancer, the fastest growing cancer in the United States. Alex and her family live in Kansas City.

Alex left 41 Action News on February 27, 2013.

Education
Alex graduated from the University of Arkansas and began her career at KZZB radio in Fort Smith, Arkansas and assumed responsibilities as anchor, reporter, and producer for Fort Smith's NBC affiliate KPOM-TV. She went on to anchor the nightly newscasts at WQAD-TV in the Quad Cities and  anchored the evening newscasts at WFLX in West Palm Beach, Florida before joining KSHB-TV.

Awards 
Alex has earned several journalism awards including 4 regional Emmy's for Best Newscast, and a number of projects including a six-month investigation into pollution at a former refinery in Sugar Creek, Missouri. Alex has been named "Best Newscaster" by Pitch Weekly magazine.

Humanitarian work 
Alex is involved in several volunteer and humanitarian causes including helping a girl from Gaza get needed medical care; becoming the local spokesperson for the National Kidney Foundation.; and partnering with KU Cancer Center to raise awareness of esophageal cancer.

References

Living people
Television anchors from Kansas City, Missouri
University of Arkansas alumni
Year of birth missing (living people)